Ukunda is a coastal town in the southern part of Mombasa. It paves way into Diani Beach, a major tourist attraction.

Location
It is located in Kwale County, Coast Province, adjacent and to the immediate west of Diani Beach, along the Indian Ocean, close to the International border with the Republic of Tanzania. The coordinates of Ukunda are:4°17'15.0"S, 39°33'58.0"E (Latitude:-4.287500; Longitude:39.566111).

Transport
Highway A-14 starts in Mombasa and runs through Ukunda, continuing south through Lunga Lunga, crossing the border into Tanzania to Tanga, ending just outside Morogoro. Ukunda is served by the Ukunda Airport.

New businesses
In November 2015, Kenyan print media indicated that Naivas Supermarkets opened a store in Ukunda at Gate mall outlets .

See also
 Kwale
 Diani Beach
 Msambweni
 List of supermarket chains in Kenya
Historic Swahili Settlements
Swahili architecture

References

External links
About Ukunda Airstrip

Swahili people
Swahili city-states
Swahili culture
Populated places in Kwale County